Joseph Douillet (1878–1954) was a Belgian diplomat to the Soviet Union, known as the author of Moscou sans Voiles: Neuf ans de travail au pays des Soviets (Moscow Unmasked: A Record of Nine Years Work in Soviet Russia) published in 1928. The work heavily criticized Soviet Communism and formed a major influence on Hergé's cartoon book Tintin in the Land of the Soviets.

Career and writings
Douillet lived in Russia from 1891 to 1926. He served as the Belgian consul in Rostov-on-Don. It has been said that he "had spent so long in the country that he was almost more Russian than Belgian." In 1925 he was arrested in the USSR and was imprisoned for nine months before being expelled from the country.

In 1928 he published a book Moscou sans Voiles: Neuf ans de travail au pays des Soviets, which condemned the Bolshevik regime. Among the charges recorded in the book are that the Soviet government created false factories to deceive foreign visitors. "The first part of Douillet's book was called: 'How the red paradise is portrayed', and is full of examples of how foreign visitors are deceived."

Another part of the book recorded how one Oebijkon coerced people into assenting for Communist rule during an election. "We see the communist comrade Oebijkon (who is resigning from the presidency) delivering a speech. This is what he says: 'We have three lists: one of these comes from the communist party. Let anyone who is against this list raise their hand!' At the same moment Oebijkon and four of his comrades pull their revolvers and direct them menacingly at the peasant audience. Oebijkon continued: 'Who votes against this list? No one? Then I declare that everyone voted for the communist list. There is no need to vote for the other two lists anymore.'" This episode would later be used in Tintin in the Land of the Soviets.

Another charge made was that the USSR presented a deceptive perspective of the state of the USSR to foreign visitors:

It was translated into English by Albert William King and published by The Pilot Press (London) in 1930.

Influence on Tintin in the Land of the Soviets

Abbe Norbert Wallez, editor of Le Petit Vingtième, gave Douillet's book to Hergé to study in order to create Tintin in the Land of the Soviets. It was the only book Hergé drew upon to write that story. Although it is now well known that most of what was published in Moscou sans Voiles is false and functioned as propaganda. 

Some specific episodes from Douillet's book are included by Hergé in Tintin in the Land of the Soviets, including coerced elections, imitating Douillet's account of Oebijkon, and fake factories made to deceive foreign visitors, in Tintin's case English Communists. "In Hergé's story, Tintin watches English communists visiting working factories, which are actually stage sets: 'And this is how those Soviets fool people who still believe in the red paradise.'" Hergé also included an incident depicting state requisitioning of kulaks' grain. Similar events occurred under War Communism and later dekulakization campaign during the collectivization.

Douillet portrayed Communists in the USSR in a very negative light and this influenced the portrayal of Communists in Hergé's book. Moscou sans Voiles is highly critical of the Soviet regime, although Hergé contextualised this by noting that in Belgium, at the time a devout Catholic nation, "Anything Bolshevik was atheist".

Hergé later dismissed the failings of this first story as "a transgression of my youth". By 1999, some part of this presentation was being noted as far more reasonable, The Economist declaring: "In retrospect, however, the land of hunger and tyranny painted by Hergé was uncannily accurate".

Later life and death
In the end of the 1920s he founded Centre International de Lutte Active Contre le Communisme (CILACC), an anti-Communist group. "Founded at the end of the 1920s by Joseph Douillet (1878-1954), CILACC and its founder were never to enjoy full confidence of the EIA [Entente Internationale Anticommuniste, another anti-Communist organization]. Douillet author of the famous Moscou sans Voiles (1926), [sic] had lived in Russia and liked to engage Russian in his enterprise"

He died in 1954.

Notes

Belgian diplomats
1878 births
1954 deaths
Belgian anti-communists
Belgian political writers
Writers about communism
Prisoners and detainees of the Soviet Union
Expatriates from Belgium in the Soviet Union
People deported from the Soviet Union
Belgian expatriates in Russia